Iron County is a county in the Upper Peninsula of the U.S. state of Michigan. As of the 2020 Census, the population was 11,631. The county seat is Crystal Falls.

History
Iron County was organized in 1885, with territory partitioned from Marquette and Menominee counties. In 1890, the county's population was 4,432. It was named for the valuable iron ore found within its borders.

Geography
Along with Dickinson County, it is one of only two landlocked counties in the Upper Peninsula.

Major highways

 – runs east–west through lower part of county. Enters west line at 6 miles (10 km) above SW corner, then runs east and southeast to Crystal Falls, where it turns south and runs into Wisconsin. Passes Mineral Hills, Iron River, and Fortune Lake.
 – runs north–south through center of county. Enters north line of county from Covington in Baraga County, then runs south to intersection with US-2 at Crystal Falls.
 – runs east from Crystal Falls into Dickinson County.
 – enters south line of county from Nelma, Wisconsin, then runs northeast to intersection with US-2 at Iron River.
 – enters south line of county from Tipler, Wisconsin, then runs north to intersection with US-2 at Iron River.

Adjacent counties

Houghton County (north/EST Border)
Baraga County (north/EST Border)
Marquette County (northeast/EST Border)
Dickinson County (east)
Florence County, Wisconsin (southeast)
Forest County, Wisconsin (south)
Vilas County, Wisconsin (southwest)
Gogebic County (west)
Ontonagon County (northwest/EST Border)

National protected area
 Ottawa National Forest (part)

Demographics

The 2010 United States Census indicates Iron County had a population of 11,817. This decrease of 1,321 people from the 2000 United States Census represents a 10.1% population decrease. In 2010 there were 5,577 households and 3,284 families in the county. The population density was 10 people per square mile (4/km2).  There were 9,197 housing units at an average density of 8 per square mile (3/km2). 97.1% of the population were White, 2.9% Native American, 0.3% Asian, 0.1% Black or African American, 0.2% of some other race and 1.4% of two or more races. 1.4% were Hispanic or Latino (of any race). 14.3% were of German, 11.5% Finnish, 11.3% Italian, 8.6% French, French Canadian or Cajun, 8.0% Swedish, 6.5% English, 5.8% American and 5.4% Irish ancestry.

There were 5,577 households, out of which 18.1% had children under the age of 18 living with them, 46.6% were married couples living together, 8.3% had a female householder with no husband present, and 41.1% were non-families. 36.8% of all households were made up of individuals, and 19.1% had someone living alone who was 65 years of age or older. The average household size was 2.06 and the average family size was 2.65.

The county population contained 17.1% under the age of 18, 5.4% from 18 to 24, 17.2% from 25 to 44, 34.1% from 45 to 64, and 26.3% who were 65 years of age or older. The median age was 51.9 years. 49.3% of the population was male, 50.7% was female.

The median income for a household in the county was $35,390, and the median income for a family was $46,337. The per capita income for the county was $20,099.  About 6.5% of families and 11.7% of the population were below the poverty line, including 18.0% of those under age 18 and 8.8% of those age 65 or over.

Government
Iron County was reliably Republican during its first three decades. However, since 1936 its voters have selected the Democratic Party nominee in 16 (out of 22) of the national elections through 2020.

Iron County operates the County jail, maintains rural roads, operates the major local courts, records deeds, mortgages, and vital records, administers public health regulations, and participates with the state in the provision of social services. The county board of commissioners controls the budget and has limited authority to make laws or ordinances. In Michigan, most local government functions – police and fire, building and zoning, tax assessment, street maintenance etc. – are the responsibility of individual cities and townships.

Education
West Iron County Schools
Forest Park School District

Communities

Cities
 Caspian
 Crystal Falls (county seat)
 Gaastra
 Iron River

Village
 Alpha

Census-designated place
 Amasa

Unincorporated communities

 Beechwood
 Colony Corners
 Elmwood
 Erickson Landing
 Forbes
 Fortune Lake
 Gibbs City – Ghost town on Paint River
 Mansfield Location
 Pentoga
 Rogers
 Stager

Townships

Bates Township
Crystal Falls Township
Hematite Township
Iron River Township
Mansfield Township
Mastodon Township
Stambaugh Township

See also
 Iron County MRA
 List of Michigan State Historic Sites in Iron County, Michigan
 National Register of Historic Places listings in Iron County, Michigan
 Alpha Michigan Brewing Company

References

External links
Iron County website
 Iron County Economic Chamber Alliance website
Iron County Profile, Sam M Cohodas Regional Economist, Tawni Hunt Ferrarini, Ph.D.
 Hunt's Guide to the Iron Mountain area
 Western Upper Peninsula Planning & Development Region
 Historic photographs of Iron County, via the Upper Peninsula Region of Library Cooperation

 
Michigan counties
1885 establishments in Michigan
Populated places established in 1885